Saul Matthews  was an enslaved African American who spied for the Continental Army during American Revolutionary War.  He spied on the British, obtaining valuable information for the Patriots. As a result of this, he was given his full freedom from slavery by the Virginia legislature in 1792:  "In consideration of many very essential services rendered to this Commonwealth during the late war … full liberty and freedom … as if he was born free."

Slavery 
Born in Virginia, Saul Mathews was a slave of Thomas Mathews.

American Revolutionary War 
In 1781 General Cornwallis and his troops captured Portsmouth, Virginia. Saul Matthews was under the command of Colonel Josiah Parker when several times Parker ordered him to go into British camps and spy on them. He always returned with much success and information, even though he was forced back into slavery for about 10 years. In 1792 he successfully petitioned the Virginia General Assembly for freedom again.

See also
Intelligence in the American Revolutionary War
Intelligence operations in the American Revolutionary War

References 

African Americans in the American Revolution
People of Virginia in the American Revolution
18th-century American slaves
American spies during the American Revolution